
Allen Mandelbaum (May 4, 1926 – October 27, 2011) was an American professor of literature and the humanities, poet, and translator from Classical Greek, Latin and Italian. His translations of classic works gained him numerous awards in Italy and the United States.

Early life and education
He was born in Albany, New York in 1926 and at age 13 moved with his family to Manhattan. After beginning his higher education at Yeshiva University, he studied English and comparative literature at Columbia University, receiving his master's degree in 1946  and his doctorate in 1951. He then spent 15 years in Italy.

Academic career
He taught English and comparative literature at the Graduate Center of the City University of New York from 1966 to 1986 and served as executive officer of the Ph.D. Program in English from 1972 to 1980. In 1989 he was named the W. R. Kenan, Jr. Professor of Humanities at Wake Forest University.

Translations
His translation of the Divine Comedy of Dante Alighieri appeared between 1980 and 1984; they were published by the University of California Press and supported by the notable Dante scholar Irma Brandeis. He subsequently acted as general editor of the California Lectura Dantis, a collection of essays on the Comedy; two volumes, on the Inferno and Purgatorio, have been published. Mandelbaum received the 1973 National Book Award in category Translation for Virgil's Aeneid. In 2000, Mandelbaum traveled to Florence, Italy, for the 735th anniversary of Dante's birth, and was awarded the Gold Medal of Honor of the City of Florence for his translation of the Divine Comedy. In 2003, he was awarded The Presidential Prize for Translation from the President of Italy, and received Italy's highest award, the Presidential Cross of the Order of the Star of Italian Solidarity.

Awards
 1973: National Book Award for translation
 2000: City of Florence Gold Medal of Honor
 2003: Italian Presidential Prize for Translation
 2003: Italian Presidential Cross of the Order of the Star of Italian Solidarity 
 Order of Merit from the Republic of Italy
 Premio Mondello
 Premio Leonardo
 Premio Biella
 Premio Lerici-Pea
 Premio Montale at the Montale Centenary in Rome
 Circe-Sabaudia Award

Death and legacy
He died in Winston-Salem, North Carolina in 2011.

Published works

Verse 
Journeyman
Leaves of Absence
Chelmaxioms: the maxims, axioms, maxioms of Chelm (1977)
A Lied of Letterpress for Moser and McGrath (1980)
The Savantasse of Montparnasse

Translations

Classics

Ovid's Metamorphoses

Contemporary Italian poetry
The Selected Writings of Salvatore Quasimodo (1960)

Edited work

References

External links

Irma Brandeis' defense of Mandelbaum's translation of the Divine Comedy
Dr. Allen Mandelbaum's Faculty Biography at Wake Forest University
World of Dante multimedia site which includes Italian text and Mandelbaum's translation of the Divine Comedy, a gallery, music, maps, timeline and searchable database

1926 births
2011 deaths
20th-century American Jews
National Book Award winners
Writers from Albany, New York
Wake Forest University faculty
American male poets
20th-century American poets
20th-century American translators
20th-century American male writers
Translators of Homer
Translators of Virgil
Translators of Dante Alighieri
Yeshiva University alumni
21st-century American Jews